The XIV Island Games (also known as the 2011 Natwest Island Games for sponsorship reasons) was a major international multi-sport event held from 25 June to 1 July 2011, in the Isle of Wight, England. A total of 2,306 athletes from 24 islands competed in 15 sports and 190 events. The 2011 Island Games was the second Island Games to be hosted by the Isle of Wight (the fourth island to host multiple Games). Previously, the Isle of Wight hosted the 1993 Island Games.

The Games' mascot was a Red Squirrel, an animal indigenous to the Isle of Wight.

The Games

Participating teams
24 islands competed in the 2011 Island Games. Numbers in parentheses indicate the number of competitors from each country. A grand total of 2,306 athletes attended the games, with 555 officials.

  (120 athletes)
 (34)
 (102)
 (70)
 (43)
 (100)
 (18)
 (140)
 (132)
 (74)
 (210)
 (46)
 (189)
 (Host) (252)
 (199)
 Menorca (125)
 (40)
 (70)
 (110)
 (11)
 (82)
 St Helena (8)
 (66)
 Ynys Môn (65)

Prince Edward Island were set to participate after missing out in 2009, but following a series of events including pulling out of contention for hosting the 2013 edition, the Island withdrew from all future editions of the Island Games and resigned from the International Island Games Association.

Sports
Numbers in parentheses indicate the number of medal events contested in each sport.

Calendar

Medal table

References

Medal table

External links

 Island Games 2011
 Results

 
Island Games
Island Games
Island Games
Multi-sport events in the United Kingdom
21st century on the Isle of Wight
Sport on the Isle of Wight
Island Games
Island Games